Tales of the Wizard of Oz is a 1961 animated television series produced by Crawley Films for Videocraft (later known as Rankin/Bass Productions). This is the second animated series produced by the studio and the first by Rankin/Bass to feature traditional animation.

Summary
The series features stories derived from characters created in L. Frank Baum's 1900 novel The Wonderful Wizard of Oz. Several characters are given additional names, including Dandy the Cowardly Lion, Rusty the Tin Man, and Socrates the Scarecrow. In this adaptation, rather than being dropped by a tornado, Dorothy and Toto are blown in from Kansas through a hole cut out of the landscape.

Each episode is a brief vignette about an adventure that the characters are involved in, often centring around the Wizard's attempts to fulfil the characters' wishes.

Artistic renditions of the Oz characters created for this series were later featured in the hourlong television special Return to Oz. The series was also adapted to a comic book for a one-shot issue in Dell's Four Color #1308 (March–May 1962).

, this series has yet to be released on DVD.

In October 2010, the series went into rotation on the Retro Television Network.

Cast
 Carl Banas as The Wizard
 Corinne Conley as Dorothy
 Bernard Cowan as Munchkins, Various
 Stan Francis as Various
 Paul Kligman as Dandy Lion, Ham
 Peggi Loder as Various
 Larry D. Mann as Rusty the Tin Man, the Wicked Witch, Topsy Turvy, Desmond the Dragon
 Alfie Scopp as Socrates the Scarecrow, Baker, Robby the Rubber Man

Episode list
 Pilot: Part 1
 Pilot: Part Two - The Witch Switch
 Leapin' Lion
 The Magic Hat
 The Balloon Buzz
 Machine-Gun Morris
 Movie Maid
 Shadow Shakes
 The Big Cake Bake
 Desmond's Dilemma
 Misfire Miss
 Gung-Ho Gang
 Heart Burn
 Stuffed
 The Fountain of Youth
 The Rubber Man
 The Happy Forest
 Dandy's Dilemma
 The Search
 The Bag of Wind
 The Music Men
 To Bee or Not to Bee
 Have Your Pie and Eat It Too
 The Sound of Munchkins
 The Count
 Places, Please
 The Green Golfer
 The Flying Carpet
 The Monkey Convention
 The Big Shot
 On the Wing
 To Stretch A Point
 The Flipped Lid
 Down in the Mouth
 The Gusher
 The Family Tree
 Boomer Rang
 The Great Laurso
 The Pudgy Lion
 Beauty and the Beach
 The Hillies and the Billies
 The School Marm
 An Optical Delusion
 Watch the Bouncing Bull
 All in a Lather
 The Green Thumb
 Leap Frog
 The Cultured Lion
 Chowy Mein
 The Super-Duper Market
 ?
 ?
 ?
 ?
 ?
 ?
 ?
 ?
 ?
 Friends of a Feather
 Monkey Air Lift
 Guaranteed for Life
 The Skills of Bravery
 The Coat of Arms
 Roar, Lion, Roar
 Be a Card
 The Inferior Decorator
 The Salesman
 The Cat's Meow
 The Yellow Brick Road
 Rusty Rusty
 The Scarecrow
 The Invisible Man
 Free Trade
 The Bull Fighter
 The Golden Touch
 The Long Hair
 Roll the Presses
 The Big Brother
 The Cool Lion
 Gabe the Gobbler
 The Raffle
 The Strawman Twist
 The Dinner Party
 The Fire Chief
 The Green Tomato
 The Poet
 The Three Musketeers
 One Big Headache
 Get Out the Vote
 ?
 ?
 ?
 ?
 The Wizard's Promise
 Well Done
 The Do-It-Yourself Heart
 The Great Oz Auto Race
 ?
 The Jail Breakers
 The Reunion
 The Sucker
 The Bubble Champ
 Too Much Heart
 The Witch's Boyfriend
 The Clock Watchers
 Double Trouble
 The O.N.
 Going to Pieces
 Mail-Order Lover
 Love Sick
 It's a Dog's Life
 The Fallen Star
 Don't Pick the Daisies
 The Munchkin Robin Hood
 The Wizard's Tail-Fins
 The Rubber Doll
#?    The Magic World Of Oz

#?    The Wisdom Teeth

#?    The Brain

#?    Bake Your Cake and Eat it Too

#?    A Fish Tale

#?    The Last Straw

#?    Plug-In Courage

#?    The Wizard's Magic Wand

#?    The Mail Man

#?    The Pony Express

Film: Return to Oz (Feb# 9, 1964)

See also

 F. R. Crawley
 Rankin/Bass
 Adaptations of The Wizard of Oz — other adaptations of The Wonderful Wizard of Oz

References

External links
 
 Tales of the Wizard of Oz at the Big Cartoon DataBase

1961 Canadian television series debuts
1961 Canadian television series endings
1960s Canadian animated television series
1961 American television series debuts
1961 American television series endings
1960s American animated television series
American children's animated adventure television series
American children's animated fantasy television series
American television shows based on children's books
Canadian children's animated adventure television series
Canadian children's animated fantasy television series
Canadian television shows based on children's books
Animated films based on The Wizard of Oz
Animated television series about orphans
Animated television series based on The Wizard of Oz
Wizards in television
Rankin/Bass Productions television series
First-run syndicated television programs in the United States